Larry Crowne is a 2011 American romantic comedy film starring Tom Hanks and Julia Roberts. The film was produced and directed by Hanks, who co-wrote its screenplay with Nia Vardalos. The story was inspired by Hanks' time studying at Chabot College. The film tells the story of Larry Crowne, a middle-aged man who unexpectedly loses his job and returns to education.

Plot

Larry Crowne, a middle-aged Navy veteran, is fired from his job at a big-box store due to a lack of college education, despite his seniority and exemplary work.  Larry, who is divorced and lives alone, cannot find a job and could lose his house. His neighbor, Lamar, suggests he enroll at East Valley Community College and get an education.

Subsisting on unemployment benefits and unable to afford to drive his SUV, Larry buys a scooter from Lamar. At the college, he becomes part of a colorful community trying to find a better future, he is nicknamed "Lance Corona" by classmate Talia. Two of the classes he takes are speech, taught by Mercedes Tainot and economics, taught by Dr. Ed Matsutani. While initially struggling in speech class, he does very well in economics.

Mercedes drinks at home after school because she is unhappily married to Dean, a former professor-turned-writer-turned-blogger. In reality, Dean spends his days looking at internet porn.

Talia invites Larry to join a club of scooter riders led by her boyfriend Dell Gordo. She also updates Larry's home decor, hair style, and wardrobe. His friend Frank, who runs the diner, offers him a job to help make ends meet, as Larry had been a Navy cook.

After a night with Dean goes horribly wrong, Mercedes is left alone at a bus stop, where Larry and his scooter gang notice her. He offers her a ride home, which she reluctantly accepts. On their way home they witness Dean getting arrested for drunk driving. 

At her front door, Mercedes invites Larry to kiss her and they hug, before she passionately starts kissing him. She wants to have sex as well, but Larry declines, not wanting to take advantage of her inebriated state. When Dean arrives home the following morning he finds all of his possessions on the front lawn.

Realizing there is no way he will not lose his house, Larry uses the knowledge he gained in his Economics class to begin a strategic foreclosure. Mercedes, meanwhile, warns Larry not to disclose the events of the previous night, and remains under the false impression that he is romantically involved with the much-younger Talia. It disappoints Larry, who had been excited about Mercedes' interest in him. He goes back to concentrating on his studies and his new job instead.

Mercedes runs into Talia, who is telling Frances, her English teacher, that she will be dropping out of college to start a thrift store. There, she finds out that Talia and Larry are just friends. Later, Frances comes over to Mercedes' to provide emotional support due to her divorce.

Finals arrive, and Larry is scheduled last. His speech is about his travels around the world while in the Navy, and also manages to include all of his classmates' topics within his own. He is given a big round of applause by his classmates and an A-plus grade from Mercedes, who is now happier in her life, and has rediscovered her passion for teaching.

A short while later, Mercedes and Frances show up at Larry's diner. She lets him know that he was an excellent student, to which he replies that she was an excellent teacher.  When the next term begins, some of the students from Mercedes' speech course register for her Shakespeare class, but Larry is not with them. He is seen taking Dr. Matsutani's second-term Economics class.  

Mercedes walks to her office and sees a note from Larry on the door, which is an invitation for French toast, with the address to his new apartment. She drives there and they kiss.

Cast

Production
Larry Crowne was first announced as Talk of the Town in February 2006. Universal Pictures set up the project as a star vehicle for Tom Hanks with Nia Vardalos hired to write the screenplay based on the life of Jim Chandler, a friend of Hanks', about a man who goes through an unexpected career change. In January 2010, Julia Roberts was cast opposite Hanks. In the following October, Bryan Cranston joined the cast. Later in the month, filming began in Los Angeles. The film's production budget totaled .

Release
In the United States and Canada, Summit Entertainment originally intended to distribute the film, but Universal Pictures claimed the distribution rights. The film grossed  over the four-day opening weekend that included the U.S. holiday Independence Day, ranking fourth at the box office.

The studio reported that 71% of the audience was over 50 years old. The independent firm CinemaScore said its exit polling showed that 93% of the audience was over 25 years old, which The Hollywood Reporter said was "old even for an adult-skewing pic". CinemaScore reported that theatergoers gave the film a "B" grade. The film's box office performance was considered a disappointment, particularly with Hanks and Roberts as the stars.

Larry Crowne grossed  in the United States and Canada, though tallies for international box office has varied depending on source. According to Box Office Magazine, the movie has grossed  worldwide.

Reception
Larry Crowne received mixed reviews from critics. Review aggregation website Rotten Tomatoes gave the film a rating of 36%, based on 191 reviews, with an average rating of 5/10. The site's consensus reads, "Despite the relaxed, easy chemistry of stars Tom Hanks and Julia Roberts, Larry Crowne is surprisingly bland and conventional." At Metacritic, which assigns a weighted average score, the film received a score of 41 out of 100, based on 41 critics, indicating "mixed or average reviews".

Roger Ebert gave the film two stars out of four, stating that the film has "a good premise and a colorful supporting cast, but what it doesn't have is a reason for existing".

Home media
The film was released on DVD and Blu-ray on November 15, 2011.

Soundtrack
The film's soundtrack was released by Rhino Records on June 28, 2011.

Track listing:
 Electric Light Orchestra – "Hold On Tight"
 Tom Petty – "Runnin' Down a Dream"
 Swingfly – "Something’s Got Me Started"
 Billy Squier – "The Stroke"
 Sky Ferreira – "Obsession"
 Electric Light Orchestra – "Calling America"
 Tom Petty & the Heartbreakers – "Listen to Her Heart"
 Smokey Robinson – "Cruisin'"
 Tyler Hilton – "Faithful"
 Tom Petty & the Heartbreakers – "Walls (No.3)"
 Jarrod Gorbel – "I’ll Do Better"
 Gigi – "The Hundredth Time"
 James Newton Howard – "French Toast"

See also
 That Thing You Do! (1996), Tom Hanks' directorial debut

References

External links
 
 
 

2011 films
French comedy films
American comedy films
Films directed by Tom Hanks
Vendôme Pictures films
Playtone films
Films scored by James Newton Howard
Films produced by Tom Hanks
Films with screenplays by Nia Vardalos
Films with screenplays by Tom Hanks
Films produced by Gary Goetzman
Films set in universities and colleges
Films shot in Los Angeles
2010s English-language films
2010s American films
2010s French films